The county of Cheshire is divided into four unitary authorities: Cheshire West and Chester, Cheshire East, Warrington, and Halton.

As there are 142 Grade I listed buildings in the county they have been split into separate lists for each unitary authority.

 Grade I listed buildings in Cheshire West and Chester
 Grade I listed buildings in Cheshire East
 Grade I listed buildings in Warrington
 Grade I listed buildings in Halton (borough)

See also
 Grade I listed churches in Cheshire
 Grade I listed non-ecclesiastical buildings in Cheshire
 Grade II* listed buildings in Cheshire